Pomatorhinus  is a genus of scimitar babblers, jungle birds with long downcurved bills. These are birds of tropical Asia, with the greatest number of species occurring in hills of the Himalayas.

These are medium-sized, floppy-tailed landbirds with soft plumage. They are typically long-tailed, dark brown above, and white or orange-brown below. Many have striking head patterns, with a broad black band through the eye, bordered with white above and below.

They have strong legs and are quite terrestrial. Like other babblers, these are noisy birds, and the characteristic bubbling calls are often the best indication that these birds are present.
As with other babbler species, they frequently occur in groups of up to a dozen, and the rainforest species like Indian scimitar babbler often occur in the mixed feeding flocks typical of tropical Asian jungle.

Species
The genus contains 11 species:

The following cladogram shows the relationships within the genera according to a 2019 phylogeny by Tianlong Cai and colleagues:

References

Collar, N. J. & Robson, C. 2007. Family Timaliidae (Babblers)  pp. 70 – 291 in; del Hoyo, J., Elliott, A. & Christie, D.A. eds. Handbook of the Birds of the World, Vol. 12. Picathartes to Tits and Chickadees. Lynx Edicions, Barcelona.

External links
 
 

 
Bird genera
Taxa named by Thomas Horsfield